Margarida Conte (born 2 September 1966) is a Brazilian handball player. She competed in the women's tournament at the 2000 Summer Olympics.

References

External links
 

1966 births
Living people
Brazilian female handball players
Olympic handball players of Brazil
Handball players at the 2000 Summer Olympics
Handball players from São Paulo
Pan American Games medalists in handball
Pan American Games gold medalists for Brazil
Pan American Games bronze medalists for Brazil
Handball players at the 1999 Pan American Games
Medalists at the 1995 Pan American Games
Medalists at the 1999 Pan American Games
21st-century Brazilian women